The Southern Line is a commuter rail line operated by Metrorail Western Cape, connecting Cape Town station in central Cape Town, South Africa with the Southern Suburbs and the towns on the west coast of False Bay, terminating in Simon's Town.

History
The Wynberg Railway Company was established in 1861 to build a railway line from Salt River Junction to Wynberg, which opened on 19 December 1864. In 1876 the company was taken over by the Cape Government Railways, and the line, which had originally been built to the standard gauge, was rebuilt to Cape gauge.

The extension to Muizenberg opened on 15 December 1882, and a further extension to Kalk Bay on 5 May 1883. The final extension, to the naval base at Simon's Town, opened on 1 December 1890. The line was electrified with overhead catenary in 1928.

Operation
The line runs on "Cape gauge"  track, and is electrified with 3,000 V DC overhead catenary. Service on the line is provided by Electric Multiple Units of Class 5M2A and Class 10M5. The units are made up in an eight-car configuration, shorter than on the other Metrorail routes in Cape Town, because many of the platforms on the Southern Line are too short to handle longer trains.

Tourism
In 2007, Cape Town Tourism, the City of Cape Town, and Metrorail collaborated to promote the Southern Line as a tourist route, focusing on tourist attractions near Cape Town, Observatory, Newlands, Muizenberg, Kalk Bay and Simon's Town stations. This includes a "hop-on, hop-off" ticket allowing unlimited travel on the line during off-peak hours.

Route

The line has a single service route, which begins at Cape Town station, with trains travelling east through Woodstock and Salt River on tracks shared with other Metrorail routes (the Cape Flats Line and the line towards Mutual). After Salt River, the route bends southwards, passing through the Southern Suburbs stations at Observatory, Mowbray, Rosebank, Rondebosch, Newlands, Claremont, Harfield Road and Kenilworth to Wynberg.

Beyond Wynberg, the route travels on southwards stopping at Wittebome, Plumstead, Steurhof, Diep River, Heathfield (where it is joined by the Cape Flats Line) and Retreat; some Southern Line trains terminate here. Most trains on the line, however, continue south through stations at Lakeside and False Bay before reaching Muizenberg, where the railway line meets the False Bay coast.

From Muizenberg the line runs south-west, immediately beside the coast, with only a thin strip of rocks and beach separating the tracks from the sea. The stations at St. James and Kalk Bay are popular with beachgoers, as is Fish Hoek. The double track ends at Fish Hoek, and so do many trains on the line. Those that continue wind along the coastline on single tracks through Sunny Cove and Glencairn to the terminus at Simon's Town.

References

External links
Cape Metrorail
Southern Line Tourism Route
Steam tourism

Railway lines in South Africa
Metrorail (South Africa)
3 ft 6 in gauge railways in South Africa
Railway lines opened in 1882